The 2008 Mississippi 1st congressional district special election was a special election in the state of Mississippi to determine who would serve the remainder of former Representative Roger Wicker's term.  After an April 22, 2008 ballot resulted in no candidate receiving a majority, Democratic Party candidate Travis Childers defeated Republican candidate Greg Davis in a runoff election on May 13, 2008.

Democratic primary

Candidates
Travis Childers, Prentiss County Clerk
Steve Holland, Mississippi State Representative
Marshall Coleman
Brian H. Neely
Ken Hurt, 2006 Democratic nominee for Mississippi's 1st congressional district

Results

Runoff Results

Republican primary

Candidates
Greg Davis, Mayor of Southaven and former Mississippi State Representative
Glenn McCullough, former Mayor of Tupelo
Randy Russell, ophthalmologist

Results

Runoff results

General election

Candidates
Travis Childers, Prentiss County Clerk (D)
Greg Davis, Mayor of Southaven and former Mississippi State Representative
John M. Wages Jr., former member of the Lee County Election Commission
Wally Pang, Batesville restaurant owner

Campaign
On December 31, 2007, Mississippi governor Haley Barbour appointed Roger Wicker to the Senate seat vacated 13 days earlier by Sen. Trent Lott. At the time of his appointment, Wicker was already a U.S. Representative for Mississippi's District 1. As a result of Wicker's appointment to the Senate, his House seat became vacant, necessitating a special election to determine who would serve the remainder of Wicker's term.

 covers the northeastern part of the state, including the cities of Columbus, Grenada, Oxford, Southaven, and Tupelo.  The district had been represented by Republican Roger Wicker since 1995.  The district has demonstrated itself to be "reliably conservative" in past elections, with George W. Bush winning the district by 25 points in the 2004 presidential election. Early speculation had Republicans Greg Davis, Glenn McCullough, and Randy Russell and Democrats Steve Holland and Jamie Franks as contenders. All but Franks ended up as candidates.

The party primaries were held on March 11. The primary runoff election was held on April 1, 2008.  According to Mississippi state election law, those who voted in the Democratic Primary on March 11 were only allowed to vote in the Democratic runoff on April 1. Mississippi was one of the states where right wing commentators such as Rush Limbaugh suggested people cross party lines on March 11 in order to keep the competition alive between Democratic presidential candidates Hillary Clinton and Barack Obama. Several websites such as the Daily Kos<ref> "DailyKos:''' Limbaugh's system-gaming could give us a new Democratic congressman ]</ref> and politico.com suggested that this is why the Republican primary runoff was so close between the more moderate McCullough and Davis as many of the more Conservative Republicans were not allowed to vote in that runoff. It is also believed that this has led to the final special election race involving a conservative Democrat (Childers) who has a better than usual chance to win the general election. Republicans were particularly concerned that a race between Childers and McCullough would've increased the Democrat's chances.

The initial special election to fill the seat was held on April 22, 2008; no one received a majority of the vote so a runoff election was held between the two top vote getters: Democrat Travis Childers (who was the top vote getter with 49.4% of the vote) and Republican Greg Davis (who received 46.3% of the initial special election vote) on May 13, 2008.

The National Republican Congressional Committee spent over $1.3 million in support of Davis' bid for the vacant seat.  Freedom's Watch, a Republican-supporting advocacy group, purchased an additional $550,000 in advertising.  The Democratic Congressional Campaign Committee spent $1.5 million in support of Childers.

Despite the district's Republican leanings, Childers defeated Davis in the final round of the special election by a 54% to 46% margin.  Once sworn in, Childers will serve through the end of the 110th Congress in January 2009.

Childers victory represents the 3rd time during the 110th Congress that a Democrat has been elected to a previously Republican-held seat in a special election. Childers victory is seen as a surprise upset for the Republican party as Mississippi's 1st district has been historically right leaning. It is believed that this sends "a clear signal of national problems ahead for Republicans in the fall". Negative campaign ads approved by Davis tried to link Childers with presidential candidate Barack Obama and his controversial former pastor Rev. Jeremiah Wright.

Childers and Davis faced off against each other in the November general election. Again, Childers won that contest.

Results

Runoff results

Newspaper endorsements
Childers was endorsed by the Northeast Mississippi Daily Journal, The Commercial Dispatch, and The Commercial Appeal''.

See also
2008 United States House of Representatives elections in Mississippi
Mississippi's 1st congressional district
2008 United States Senate special election in Mississippi
2008 Illinois's 14th congressional district special election
2008 Louisiana's 6th congressional district special election

External links
 Official election page from Mississippi Secretary of State
 
 Commercial Dispatch Online, Election Results

Campaigns' websites

Greg Davis for Congress
Steve Holland for Congress

Vote John Wages

References

Mississippi 2008 01
Mississippi 2008 01
2008 01 Special
Mississippi 01 Special
United States House of Representatives 01 Special
United States House of Representatives 2008 01
United States House of Representatives Mississippi 01